Dinosaur Pile-Up are an English alternative rock band formed in late 2007. Hailing from Leeds, West Yorkshire. Current members are lead singer and guitarist Matt Bigland, drummer Mike Sheils and bassist Jim Cratchley. Their past members include Steve Wilson (2008-2010), Tom Dornford-May (2008-2010), Tommy Davidson (2008), Harry Johns (2010-2011), and James Sacha (2013).

History

Formation and name
Dinosaur Pile-Up formed after guitarist Bigland's band Mother Vulpine dissolved in 2007. Bigland had been creating songs used for Dinosaur Pile-Up whilst he was in Mother Vulpine. Bigland recorded a demo tape consisting of the songs "My Rock 'n' Roll", "Love Is a Boat and We're Sinking", "Melanin", "Let's Get Up", "What Howard Said" and "I Get My Direction" whilst he was still in Mother Vulpine. A short time later, after Mother Vulpine broke up, Bigland recruited Tom Dornford-May on bass and Steve Wilson on drums to complete the line up.

Matt Bigland has said he thought of the name 'Dinosaur Pile-Up' after watching the 2005 film King Kong. Matt Bigland has said in an interview; "I watched the remake of King Kong. Which was pretty bad! It was ages ago, before this band, or even the idea of this band ever existed. Anyway, there was this part in it where this stampede of dinosaurs, the front one is shot in the leg or something, and it trips up, and then all these huge dinosaurs trip up, roll down this hill, and it just ends up in this massive pile up, and everything in between them survives. I thought it was ridiculous, and as a joke I said, I have to start a band called Dinosaur Pile-Up."

Early releases and line-up change
Dinosaur Pile-Up then released My Rock 'n' Roll EP in late 2008 and the Traynor 7" and The Most Powerful EP in the Universe in 2009. Also in 2009, they played on the BBC introducing stage at Leeds Festival and were invited on tour with alternative rock group Pixies on their European tour. Then in 2010, Tom Dornford-May and Steve Wilson left the band. Steve Wilson joined the band Japanese Voyeurs (whom Dinosaur Pile-Up would later tour with on the Rock Sound Exposure Tour alongside The Xcerts), and Tom Dornford-May joined the punk rock band Fake Death. Matt Bigland then went into the studio alone to record Dinosaur Pile-Up's debut album Growing Pains, and bassist Harry Johns and drummer Mike Sheils were recruited for the rhythm section for live shows.

Growing Pains
The recording of Growing Pains took place between late 2009 and early 2010 in the space of about two and a half months. Growing Pains was recorded solely by Matt Bigland playing all the parts on the album in a home studio in Bridlington. After the release of Growing Pains in October 2010, Dinosaur Pile-Up began a full UK tour, also playing in the rock exposure tour and various dates across Mexico, as well as supporting slots with bands such as Feeder, Cage the Elephant, Turbowolf and Twin Atlantic. By August 2011, the band had finished their tour and are set to record their follow up album due to be released at the beginning of 2012. On 1 December, they uploaded to their SoundCloud and Facebook accounts demos of two tracks, "In My Room" and "Thread", which were said to be featured on their second album, 'Nature Nurture', but never made it onto the album, they only appeared as B-sides.

In November 2011, Matt Bigland posted on the Dinosaur Pile-Up website that Harry Johns had left the band to concentrate on his solo project and that two people known as Alessio and Scott were filling in on bass and second guitar. Also, On 8 March 2012, Japanese Voyeurs had announced their breakup and said on their Facebook that their bassist Johnny Seymour had joined Dinosaur Pile-Up. Matt Bigland has also said he was currently in the studio recording the second album and would be recording every instrument on the record as he did on Growing Pains

Nature Nurture 
On 22 January 2013, Dinosaur Pile-Up announced the follow-up to Growing Pains, 'Nature Nurture', with the free-download of 'Lip Hook Kiss' off the band's website. The album was released in the UK in June 2013 and in the U.S. in February 2014 on So Recordings, the rock imprint of Silva Screen Records. To coincide with the band's debut U.S. tour supporting You Me At Six, they released a video for the song 'Peninsula' as well as the U.S. exclusive Peninsula EP. In late February 2014, the band undertook another U.S. tour supporting Middle Class Rut with additional showcases at South by Southwest. They also supported Brand New on a U.S. tour in July 2014. They continued to tour until December 2014, ending their tour in Delhi.

Eleven Eleven 
On 14 December 2014, Dinosaur Pile-Up announced the recording of their third album, 'Eleven Eleven', via an Instagram post. They also revealed to be working with the greatly acknowledged producer Tom Dalgety, who had worked with successful acts like Royal Blood and Turbowolf, in Rockfield Studios. Throughout the next months, various teasers were released on images and videos of the band in the studio, including a YouTube video on working with the famous producer in Rockfield. In the middle of March 2015, after the constant teasing of something being announced at 11:11 of random days, revealed a brand new song entitled '11:11' via a SoundCloud stream and the album title 'Eleven Eleven'. They revealed a teaser for a brand new music video in April of the same year. In May 2015, they also announced the 2nd EP release limited to Japan to be released on 22 July, entitled '11:11 - EP', consisting of new tracks from the album including bonus track 'Replace Me'. The album was set for release worldwide on 16 October 2015, with album bundles including signed vinyl and exclusive T-shirts.

Due to lack of a worldwide distributor, the release of Eleven Eleven was delayed by almost a year before being finally released to the rest of the world, meaning, in certain parts of the world, the band were touring an album that had already been out for ages in the UK, but were new everywhere else. This outraged the band, with drummer, Mike Sheils stating in a 2017 interview in the US, 'it's really strange, yeah, as it seems like a lifetime ago we recording the whole thing now, but over here it's fresh as a daisy. It is what it is, mind you, and we're just lucky we finally managed to get it out, there, you know? People seem to be enjoyin' it and we love playing it. It's a new direction for us.'

Celebrity Mansions 
The band's fourth studio album, Celebrity Mansions, was released on 7 June 2019. The lead single from the album, "Thrash Metal Cassette", was released in March 2019. The band released their second single from the album "Back Foot" in May 2019 and third single "Round the Bend" in June 2019. Loudwire named the album one of the 50 best rock albums of 2019.

Musical style
Dinosaur Pile-Up have alternative rock influences from bands like Foo Fighters, Weezer, Nirvana, The Smashing Pumpkins and Pavement, rock acts from the 60s like The Beach Boys and The Beatles, and metal groups such as Slayer and Deftones.

Since Nature Nurture the band usually play in drop C sharp tuning or E♭ tuning with or without a capo, tuning down half a step from standard tuning and drop D tuning as was used on earlier material.

Members
Current
Matt Bigland – vocals, guitar (2007–present)
Jim Cratchley – bass (2013–present)
Mike Sheils – drums (2010–present)

Former
Tom Dornford-May – bass (2008–2010)
Steve Wilson – drums (2008–2010)
Harry Johns – bass (2010–2012)
Johnny Seymour – bass (2012)
James Sacha – bass (2013)

Timeline

Discography

Studio albums

Extended plays

Singles

Music videos

References

External links
 Official website
 MySpace

Alternative rock groups from Leeds